Sobhana Mostary (born 13 February 2002) is a Bangladeshi cricketer who plays as a right-handed batter. In April 2018, she was named in the Bangladesh Women for their series against South Africa Women. She made her Women's One Day International cricket (WODI) debut for Bangladesh against South Africa Women on 14 May 2018.

In August 2019, she was named in Bangladesh's squad for the 2019 ICC Women's World Twenty20 Qualifier tournament in Scotland. She made her Women's Twenty20 International (WT20I) debut for Bangladesh, against the Netherlands, on 23 August 2019.

In January 2020, she was named in Bangladesh's squad for the 2020 ICC Women's T20 World Cup in Australia. In November 2021, she was named in Bangladesh's team for the 2021 Women's Cricket World Cup Qualifier tournament in Zimbabwe. In January 2022, she was named in Bangladesh's team for the 2022 Commonwealth Games Cricket Qualifier tournament in Malaysia. Later the same month, she was named in Bangladesh's team for the 2022 Women's Cricket World Cup in New Zealand.

References

External links
 
 

2002 births
Living people
People from Rangpur District
Bangladeshi women cricketers
Bangladesh women One Day International cricketers
Bangladesh women Twenty20 International cricketers
Rangpur Division women cricketers
Southern Zone women cricketers
South Asian Games gold medalists for Bangladesh
South Asian Games medalists in cricket